Associazione Sportiva Gubbio 1910 is an Italian association football club, based in Gubbio, Umbria. The club play in Serie C, the third tier of Italian football.

History
The multi-sport club SPES Gubbio was founded in 1908. In 1910 SPES Gubbio began its football activity, and the official football sector was established on 25 March 1913.

In February 2009, the club made national headlines by hiring 70-year-old UEFA Cup-winning coach Luigi Simoni as technical director (due to age limits), with former under-19 team boss Riccardo Tumiatti being promoted as first team coach. In the season 2010–11 Lega Pro Prima Divisione season the club won promotion to Serie B after 63 years, under the guidance of Vincenzo Torrente (as appointed by Simoni himself). However, Gubbio's stay in the second tier of Italian football lasted only one season as they were immediately relegated back to Lega Pro Prima Divisione.

Colours and stadium
The team's colours are dark blue and red.

Their home field is the Stadio Pietro Barbetti, a 5,300 capacity all-seater stadium.

Current squad

Out on loan

References

External links
 

 
Football clubs in Italy
Football clubs in Umbria
Association football clubs established in 1910
Serie B clubs
Serie C clubs
1910 establishments in Italy